Ring LLC is a home security and smart home company owned by Amazon. Ring manufactures home security products that incorporate outdoor surveillance cameras, including the Ring Video Doorbell smart doorbell, and hosts an app, Neighbors, for online social sharing of captured footage among users. Ring also provides video footage from its cameras and data from its Neighbors app to law enforcement agencies on request. Its police partnerships have been criticized by civil rights advocacy groups as building an invasive private surveillance network. Privacy concerns have increased since Mayor London Breed of San Francisco has supported ordinances that would allow city police to be able to access Ring footage at any time.

History

Pre-acquisition (2013–2017) 
In 2013, Ring was founded as Doorbot by Jamie Siminoff. Doorbot was crowdfunded via Christie Street, and raised 364,000, more than the $250,000 requested.

In 2013, Siminoff and Doorbot appeared on an episode of the reality series Shark Tank to seek a $700,000 investment in the company, which he estimated was worth $7 million. Kevin O'Leary made an offer as a potential investor but Siminoff declined it. After being on Shark Tank, Siminoff rebranded the company, which received $5 million in additional sales.

In 2016, Shaquille O'Neal acquired an equity stake in Ring, and subsequently became a spokesperson in the company's marketing.

The company raised over $200 million in investments from Kleiner Perkins Caufield & Byers, Qualcomm Ventures, Goldman Sachs, DFJ Growth and Sir Richard Branson.

Subsidiary of Amazon (2018–present) 
In February 2018, Ring was acquired by Amazon for an estimated value of between $1.2 to $1.8 billion.

In January 2019, it was uncovered that employees at Ring's two offices had access to the video recordings from all Ring devices. In addition, The Intercept reported that the video data was stored unencrypted.

In June 2019, Ring faced criticism over a "Community Alert" program, under which the company has made geographically-targeted sponsored posts on social media services such as Facebook, asking readers to provide tips on suspects in verified cases, based on imagery posted on the Neighbors service by a Ring customer. Ring stated that it sought permission from the user before using their content in this manner. However, these discoveries did lead to concerns over the use of such footage in material deemed to effectively be advertising, as well as concerns over other possible uses of the footage (such as for training facial recognition) due to the wide copyright license that users must grant to in order to use Neighbors (an irrevocable, unlimited, and royalty-free license to use shared content "for any purpose and in any media formats in any media channels without compensation to you"), and Ring's partnerships with local law enforcement agencies.

In July 2019, Vice publication Motherboard obtained records revealing the extent of Ring's partnership with the Lakeland (Florida) Police Department (LPD). The department was granted access to a "Law Enforcement Neighborhood Portal" for making posts on Neighbors and the ability to "request videos directly from Ring users," and received a donation of 15 Ring cameras. However, the memorandum of understanding stated that the LPD would be required to participate in "outreach efforts on the platform to encourage adoption of the platform/app" (receiving $10 credits for Ring camera purchases for each new user). Ring also recommended that the LPD establish specific new positions for the partnership, including a "social media coordinator". Later in the month, Motherboard obtained public records containing an officer's notes from an April 2019 training webinar, which stated that Ring had partnered with at least 200 law enforcement partners. In early August 2019, Motherboard also reported that Ring would match payments by cities to cover the subsidized purchase of Ring cameras, so that they could be resold to residents at a discount.

Cybersecurity firm Bitdefender identified a vulnerability in the Ring Video Doorbell Pro product in July 2019, which was patched before being publicly disclosed in November 2019. Security hackers accessed a number of Ring cameras in December 2019 and used the device speakers to broadcast racial slurs, threats, and other inflammatory language to multiple households across the United States. A Motherboard investigation discovered crime forums that distributed software exploits of Ring devices that were used in the cyberattacks. NulledCast, a podcast on Discord, livestreamed some of the incidents. Ring responded to the incidents by advising its users to have strong passwords, enable two-factor authentication, and adopt other security measures. Ring mandated two-factor authentication for all users on February 18, 2020.

The United States House Committee on Oversight and Reform launched an investigation into Ring's data-sharing partnerships with local governments and police departments on February 19, 2020.

Products and services

Ring Video Doorbell 
The Ring Video Doorbell is the company's flagship product; it is a smart doorbell that contains a high-definition camera, a motion sensor, and a microphone and speaker for two-way audio communication. It integrates with an associated mobile app, Neighbors, which allows users to view real-time video from the camera, receive notifications when the doorbell is rung, and communicate with visitors at the door via the integrated speaker and microphone. It is also capable of operating as a surveillance camera, and can automatically trigger recordings when rung, or when its motion sensors are activated. A second-generation model, Ring Doorbell 2, was released in 2017, with updated hardware and a 1080p camera with improved low-light performance, that does not rely solely on Wi-Fi, unlike the original model. The Ring Doorbell Pro interoperates with Amazon Alexa to play prerecorded greetings to visitors and allow visitors to leave a message.

The "Ring Chime" accessory is a unit plugged into a power outlet to play the doorbell's chime. The "Chime Pro" is an extended version that also doubles as a wireless repeater for Wi-Fi networks.

In November 2020, Amazon announced the recall of 350,000 Ring doorbells in the United States and 8,700 in Canada due to a potential fire risk.

Ring Cameras 

In 2015, Ring released the "Stick-Up Cam", a wireless IP camera. It was updated in 2018 with a cylindrical form factor, motion detection, two-way audio, as well as battery, wired, and solar power options. In 2017, Ring released the "Floodlight Cam", a camera integrated with a pair of motion-activated LED floodlights, and in 2019, the "Ring Indoor Cam" was released, an indoor camera.

Ring Alarm 
In July 2018, Ring launched an alarm security kit called the Ring Alarm, which includes a keypad, siren, and motion sensors. At CES 2019, Ring announced a peephole camera.

Always Home Camera 
In September 2020, Ring unveiled the "Always Home Cam", an aerial indoor camera that flies on a predetermined path when activated by an alarm sensor.

Automotive security 
In September 2020, Ring unveiled a new line of automotive products, including the Ring Car Alarm and Car Cam. Car Alarm is an OBD-II car alarm that can send alerts of events such as break-ins via Ring and Amazon Alexa, and leverages Amazon Sidewalk for connectivity. Car Cam consists of a dashcam and a rear window camera to capture the interior of a car, and features similar car alarm functionality, as well as "emergency crash assist" to automatically notify emergency services if a "serious crash" is detected, as well as having a "traffic stop" voice command.

In addition, Ring announced the launch of Car Connect—a platform allowing car manufacturers to integrate existing cameras and security systems within vehicles (such as backup cameras) into the Ring platform. Tesla was announced as the first partner for Car Connect, with plans to offer an aftermarket accessory for the Model 3, Model X, Model S, and Model Y in 2021.

Astro as robotic home security guard 
In September 2022, Amazon announced a pilot program to use the domestic robot Astro as a remote-controlled security guard connected to Ring security devices. A promotional video shows a woman in a call center remote-controlling the robot to confront burglars after receiving an alert from the Ring security system. An article in MIT Tech Review notes that "combining Astro’s ability to roam around a house with Ring’s established surveillance system, might create even more surveillance problems than either product did in their previous iterations".

Subscription plans 
Ring products require a "Ring Protect" subscription plan in order to store and view recordings from the cameras; without a subscription, the user is limited to real-time footage only. The "Ring Protect Basic" plan allows footage to be retained for 60 days, while the "Ring Protect Plus" subscription adds "unlimited" storage of footage, enables professional monitoring and LTE cellular backup on the Ring Alarm, and extends the warranty on the user's Ring products from one year to the life of the devices.

Neighbors app 

In 2018, Ring launched Neighbors, a hyperlocal social networking app. Described as being akin to a neighborhood watch, it allows users to crowdsource information on and discuss safety and security concerns in their area. The service allows users to share footage captured from Ring products. All user posts are anonymous and do not include specific location information, and are moderated to remove off-topic content (in contrast to services such as Nextdoor). Ring also has partnerships with local police departments in some cities to incorporate Neighbors into their crime monitoring processes, who are able to make official posts for distribution on the service. Ring has credited the service with having helped to solve crimes, and noted that activity on the service surged in areas of California affected by wildfires in November 2018.

Amazon disclosed Ring's criteria for accepting requests from police departments for video footage shared to the Neighbors portal in a response to Massachusetts Senator Ed Markey on November 1, 2019. Ring stated that each police request was required to be associated with a case number and submitted individually, although no evidence was needed for footage to be given. Markey criticized Amazon's response, describing Ring as "an open door for privacy and civil liberty violations".

Police departments may access user-generated footage through the Ring Neighborhoods portal, using a map interface. Amazon claims that it seeks permission from applicable users before releasing footage to law enforcement, but may release footage without user consent in emergency situations, or under subpoena. In July 2022, Amazon stated to in a letter to Markey that it had released footage without user permission at least eleven times so far in 2022—the company's first public confirmation that it has done so.

Reception

Products  
TechHive gave the second-generation Ring doorbell a 4 out of 5, noting improvements in hardware and ease of installation over the first-generation model, but criticizing a lack of printed and online documentation.

Controversy

Police partnerships 

Digital rights advocacy group Fight for the Future criticized Ring for using its cameras and Neighbors app to build a private surveillance network via partnerships with local law enforcement agencies, which encourage them to promote the products. The group stated that these partnerships "undermine our democratic process and basic civil liberties". According to the Electronic Frontier Foundation, Ring used these partnerships and its marketing strategies to foster fear, which leads to a "vicious cycle" that spurs hardware sales. The organization said that Ring, as well as Neighbors and similar "neighborhood watch" apps such as Citizen and Nextdoor, "facilitate reporting of so-called 'suspicious' behavior that really amounts to racial profiling." Matt Cagle of the American Civil Liberties Union said that the Ring Neighbors Portal "blurs the line between corporate and government surveillance" and that "Many people are not going to feel like they have a choice when law enforcement asks for access to their footage".

In November 2020, a pilot program in Jackson, Mississippi, enabled participating Ring users to enable police to livestream their cameras at anytime.

Security vulnerabilities 
In a December 2019 test, Motherboard found that Ring's software did not implement "basic security features", allowing the publication to access a Ring account from IP addresses based in multiple countries without warning the user.

The Nextdoor network leaks metadata about the footage posted in videos and "crime alerts". This metadata, combined with public city map data, is frequently sufficient to discover the exact location of the Ring doorbell or a camera. In one experiment, Gizmodo located 20 thousand devices based on information collected (scraped from the app) over a period of month. University researchers were able to locate 440,000 devices using data spanning back to 2016.

Amazon Sidewalk 

Amazon Sidewalk is enabled on supported Ring devices, as well as Amazon Alexa devices, by default, allowing devices owned by different users to communicate and transmit data without consent of either owner. Gizmodo criticized Amazon Sidewalk for allowing strangers to connect to Ring owners' home Wi-Fi network.

Allegations of user tracking 
On January 27, 2020, the Electronic Frontier Foundation concluded that the Ring doorbell app for Android was sending identifiable personal information– including names, IP addresses, mobile network carriers, persistent IDs and sensor data –to four analytics and marketing companies: Facebook, Mixpanel, AppsFlyer and branch.io.

Allegations of trademark infringement 
In April 2021, ADT Inc. sued Ring LLC for trademark infringement, after re-introducing blue octagonal signs that were too similar to the ADT logo. Ring first agreed to cease using a similar logo in 2016 following a prior complaint.

References

External links 

 

Home automation companies
IOS software
Android (operating system) software
American companies established in 2013
Companies based in Santa Monica, California
Amazon (company) acquisitions
Amazon (company) hardware
2018 mergers and acquisitions
Crime mapping